Wojciech Zaremba is a Polish computer scientist, a co-founder of OpenAI (2016–present), where he leads both the Codex research and language teams. The teams actively work on AI that writes computer code and creating successors to GPT-3 respectively. The mission of OpenAI is to build safe artificial intelligence (AI), and ensure that its benefits are as evenly distributed as possible.

Early life 
Zaremba was born in Kluczbork, People’s Republic of Poland. At a young age, he won local competitions and awards in mathematics, computer science, chemistry and physics. In 2007, Zaremba represented Poland in the International Mathematical Olympiad in Vietnam, and won a silver medal.

Zaremba studied at the University of Warsaw and École Polytechnique mathematics and computer science, and graduated in 2013 with two master's degrees in mathematics. He then began his PhD at New York University (NYU) in deep learning under the supervision of Yann LeCun and Rob Fergus. Zaremba graduated and received his PhD in 2016.

Career 
During his bachelor studies, he spent time at NVIDIA during the pre deep learning era (2008).
His PhD was divided between Google Brain where he spent a year, and Facebook Artificial Intelligence Research where he spent another year.

During his stay at Google, he co-authored work on adversarial examples for neural networks. This result created the field of adversarial attacks on neural networks.

His PhD is focused on matching capabilities of neural networks with the algorithmic power of programmable computers.

In 2015, Zaremba became one of the co-founders of OpenAI, a non-profit artificial intelligence (AI) research company. The aim of the project is to create safe artificial intelligence. In OpenAl, Zaremba works as robotics research manager. Zaremba sits on the advisory board of Growbots, a Silicon Valley startup company aiming to automate sales processes with the use of machine learning and artificial intelligence.

Honors and awards 
 Listed among the most influential Polish under 30s, Polish edition of Forbes magazine 2017
 Google Fellowship 2015
 Silver Medal in 48th International Mathematical Olympiad, Vietnam

References 

Artificial intelligence
Computer scientists
People from Kluczbork
Polish mathematicians
Polish expatriates in the United States
University of Warsaw alumni
New York University alumni
1988 births
Living people